The ETAS Group is a German company which designs tools for the development of embedded systems for the automotive industry and other sectors of the embedded industry. ETAS is 100-percent subsidiary of Robert Bosch GmbH.

Business 

ETAS GmbH, founded in 1994, is a one hundred percent subsidiary of Robert Bosch GmbH with international subsidiaries and sales offices in France, the United States, Canada, China, Japan, the United Kingdom, India, Korea, Brazil, Sweden, Italy, and the Russian Federation. ETAS GmbH does not publish its own annual report. The total number of associates amounted to 1,500 as of June 2021.

In 2003, the ETAS Group was formed by the merger of the Bosch subsidiary ETAS GmbH (the company name being the acronym of Engineering Tools, Application and Services), LiveDevices Ltd., York, United Kingdom, and Vetronix Corporation, Santa Barbara, California, United States. The company's headquarters is located in Stuttgart. ETAS provides automakers, their suppliers, engineering service providers, and customers from other sectors of the embedded industry with tools for embedded systems, e.g. development tools (in the form of both software and hardware) for ECUs used in passenger cars and trucks, engineering services, consulting, training, and support. With the objective of achieving shorter development cycles, increased software quality, and improved fault analysis, tools of this kind have been deployed in the auto industry since the early nineties.

The ETAS subsidiary ESCRYPT (acquired in Aug-2012) provides security solutions related to embedded systems.

Major product lines

ASCET 

Open product family for the model-based development of embedded automotive software:
 Model-based software design for control functions and control algorithms
 Office, lab, or vehicle-based simulation and rapid prototyping of Electronic Control Unit (ECU) functions
 Automatic code generation for ECUs in production quality (more than 65 million produced since 1997)
 Compatible with standards such as ASAM (including MSR (Manufacturer and Suppliers Relationship Group), OSEK, AUTOSAR, MISRA, XML, UML and IEC 61508 (certified for safety-critical systems)
 Compatible with tools such as MATLAB/Simulink.
Typical deployment in the development of electronic control units for internal combustion engines, hybrid propulsion systems, transmission control units, chassis management systems (ABS, ESC), as well as convenience electronics

INCA 

INCA is a measuring and calibration environment for ECUs:
 Measuring, displaying, recording and evaluation of ECU data
 Adjustment and administration of data records
 Based on open automotive standards
 Suitable for deployment in the lab, in the vehicle and on the test bench
According to corporate claims, ETAS is the market leader for measurement and calibration tools.

INTECRIO 

Product family for the virtual prototyping and rapid prototyping of ECU functions:
 Integration of models created in ASCET and MATLAB/Simulink, as well as C-Code
 Verification and validation of ECU functions, also in real-time conditions
 Suited to deployment in office, lab and vehicle

LABCAR 

Product family for the creation of a Hardware-In-The-Loop (HiL) setup. LABCAR is mainly a development application for the hardware interface connection to the ECU: Some execution and automation of ECU tests, based on models created in ASCET and MATLAB/Simulink, is possible to integrate into LABCAR. LABCAR is inseparably connected to Experiment Environment (EE), which usually is the control panel of the HiL currently running.

RTA-OSEK 

Real-time operating systems (RTOS) for ECU microcontrollers:
 Conformant with standards such as OSEK, AUTOSAR, MISRA
 High performance for OSEK operating systems
 Installed base in the hundreds of millions

Hardware 

Various hardware products serving specialized purposes:
 Connecting ECU processors (e.g., ETK)
 Measurement data acquisition
 Real-time simulation of ECU functions or of physical ECU environments
 Applications for diagnostics and testing for vehicle manufacturers and service shops (e.g., diagnostic scanner for reading a vehicle's fault memory).

References 

German companies established in 1994
Software companies of Germany
Automotive companies of Germany
Robert Bosch GmbH